Craig Dolby (born 31 March 1988 in Melton Mowbray, Leicestershire, England) is a British racing driver. He has raced in Formula Renault series around the world for most of his career, winning the Formula Renault 1.6 Belgium championship in 2006.

Since 2008 he has raced in the Superleague Formula and has raced for R.S.C. Anderlecht in the 2008 season and Tottenham Hotspur in the 2009 season.

As of 2019, Dolby worked as a stunt driver on movie sets on major film productions. He had the opportunity to pursue that career through a contact he met in the Superleague paddock.

Racing record

Career summary

Superleague Formula

2008-2009
(Races in bold indicate pole position) (Races in italics indicate fastest lap)

2009 Super Final results
Super Final results in 2009 did not count for points towards the main championship.

2010

  † Non-championship event.

Complete FIA World Endurance Championship results

Complete Stock Car Brasil results

† Ineligible for championship points.

Complete Formula Acceleration 1 results
(key) (Races in bold indicate pole position) (Races in italics indicate fastest lap)

Complete Blancpain Sprint Series results

References

External links
 
 
 
 
 Q&A with Craig Dolby

1988 births
Living people
Sportspeople from Melton Mowbray
English racing drivers
Belgian Formula Renault 1.6 drivers
British Formula Renault 2.0 drivers
Italian Formula Renault 2.0 drivers
French Formula Renault 2.0 drivers
Superleague Formula drivers
FIA World Endurance Championship drivers
Stock Car Brasil drivers
International GT Open drivers
Blancpain Endurance Series drivers
24 Hours of Spa drivers
Performance Racing drivers
Team Astromega drivers
Alan Docking Racing drivers